Roger Henri Ludovic Maria van Boxtel (born 8 February 1954) is a retired Dutch politician of the Democrats 66 (D66) party and businessman.

Van Boxtel attended a Keizer Karel Gymnasium in Amstelveen from April 1966 until May 1973 and applied at the University of Amsterdam in June 1973 majoring in Medicine and obtaining a Bachelor of Medical Sciences degree in June 1975 before switching to Law and obtaining a Bachelor of Laws degree in May 1977 before graduating with a Master of Laws degree in July 1981. Van Boxtel worked as management consultant and legal advisor for the Municipalities association (VNG) from August 1981 until February 1986 and a civil servant for the Immigration and Naturalisation Service (IND) of the Ministry of Justice from February 1986 until August 1994.

Van Boxtel became a Member of the House of Representatives after Jacob Kohnstamm was appointed as State Secretary for the Interior in the Cabinet Kok I after the election of 1994, taking office on 30 August 1994 serving as a frontbencher and the de facto Whip and spokesperson for Health, Social Work, Minorities, Welfare and deputy spokesperson for Housing and Spatial Planning, Kingdom Relations and Abortion. After the election of 1998 the new Leader of the Democrats 66 Els Borst opted to remain Minister of Health, Welfare and Sport in the Cabinet Kok II and unexpectedly announced that she was stepping down as Leader, Van Boxtel announced his candidacy to succeed her. Van Boxtel lost the leadership election to Parliamentary leader Thom de Graaf on 30 May 1998. Following the cabinet formation of 1998 Van Boxtel was appointed as Minister for Integration and Urban Planning in the Cabinet Kok II, taking office on 3 August 1998. Van Boxtel served as acting Minister of the Interior and Kingdom Relations from 13 March 2000 until 24 March 2000 following the resignation of Bram Peper. After the election of 2002 Van Boxtel was re-elected to the House of Representatives but resigned his seat before the installation and announced his retirement from national politics, the Cabinet Kok II was replaced by the Cabinet Balkenende I on 22 July 2002.

Van Boxtel semi-retired from national politics and became active in the private sector and public sector and occupied numerous seats as a corporate director and nonprofit director on several boards of directors and supervisory boards (AkzoNobel, Humanist Association and the International Union for Conservation of Nature). In May 2003 Van Boxtel was named as Chief executive officer (CEO) of insurance company Menzis and in August 2004 he was also named as Chairman of the Board of directors. Van Boxtel also worked as a trade association executive for the Healthcare Insurance association (ZN) serving as Vice Chairman of the Executive Board from 20 January 2014 until 30 May 2015 and the Industry and Employers confederation (VNO-NCW) and as a media administrator for the public broadcaster Dutch Program Foundation (NPS) serving as Chairman of the Supervisory board from 1 January 2004 until 1 August 2008 and as a sport administrator for Professional footballclub AFC Ajax serving as Technical director from 1 November 2011 until 30 January 2012. Van Boxtel was elected as a Member of the Senate after the Senate election of 2011 and was selected as Parliamentary leader of the Democrats 66 in the Senate, taking office on 7 June 2011. In September 2014 Van Boxtel announced his retirement from national politics and that he wouldn't stand for the Senate election of 2015 and continued to serve until the end of the parliamentary term on 9 June 2015.

Van Boxtel retired after spending 21 years in national politics but remained active in the private sector and public sector and continued to occupy numerous seats as a corporate director and nonprofit director on several boards of directors and supervisory boards (Meteorological Institute, VU University Medical Center, Institute for Multiparty Democracy, J.C. Bloem-poëzieprijs and Museum de Fundatie) and serves on several state commissions and councils on behalf of the government (Netherlands Film Fund, Public Pension Funds APB and the Social and Economic Council). In July 2015 Van Boxtel was named as Chief executive officer and Chairman of the Board of directors of the state-owned passenger railway operator Nederlandse Spoorwegen (NS)., a role in which he served until 30 September 2020, when he was succeeded by Marjan Rintel.

Decorations

References

External links

Official
  Mr. R.H.L.M. (Roger) van Boxtel Parlement & Politiek
  Mr. R.H.L.M. van Boxtel (D66) Eerste Kamer der Staten-Generaal

 

 
 

 

 

 

 

1954 births
Living people
Democrats 66 politicians
Directors of football clubs in the Netherlands
Dutch chief executives in the finance industry
Dutch chief executives in the healthcare industry
Dutch chief executives in the rail transport industry
Dutch corporate directors
Dutch humanists
Dutch management consultants
Dutch nonprofit directors
Dutch nonprofit executives
Dutch public broadcasting administrators
Dutch sports executives and administrators
Dutch trade association executives
Members of the House of Representatives (Netherlands)
Members of the Senate (Netherlands)
Members of the Social and Economic Council
Ministers of Kingdom Relations of the Netherlands
Ministers of the Interior of the Netherlands
Ministers without portfolio of the Netherlands
Officers of the Order of Orange-Nassau
People from Amstelveen
Businesspeople from Gorinchem
People from Tilburg
University of Amsterdam alumni
20th-century Dutch civil servants
20th-century Dutch jurists
20th-century Dutch politicians
21st-century Dutch businesspeople
21st-century Dutch civil servants
21st-century Dutch jurists
21st-century Dutch politicians